These are the statistics for the 2017 FIFA Confederations Cup, an eight-team tournament that ran from 17 June 2017 through 2 July 2017. The tournament took place in Russia.

Goalscorers

Assists

Scoring

Man of the Match

Overall statistics

Stadiums

References

External links

2017 FIFA Confederations Cup at FIFA.com

Statistics